The Reform Party of the United States of America held primary elections for its presidential candidate in May 2016. Out of 5 contestants, Rocky De La Fuente emerged as the party nominee.

Candidates

Nominee

Other Candidates

References

Reform Party of the United States of America presidential primaries
Reform